Charly (marketed and stylized as CHAЯLY) is a 1968 American drama film directed and produced by Ralph Nelson and written by Stirling Silliphant. It is based on Flowers for Algernon, a science-fiction short story (1958) and subsequent novel (1966) by Daniel Keyes.

The film stars Cliff Robertson as Charly Gordon, an intellectually disabled adult who is selected by two doctors to undergo a surgical procedure that triples his IQ as it had done for a laboratory mouse who underwent the same procedure. The film also stars Claire Bloom, Lilia Skala, Leon Janney, Dick Van Patten and Barney Martin. Robertson had played the same role in a 1961 television adaptation titled "The Two Worlds of Charlie Gordon," an episode of the anthology series The United States Steel Hour.

The film received positive reviews and was a success at the box office and later in home media sales. Robertson won Best Actor at the Academy Awards.

Plot 
Charly Gordon is an intellectually disabled man who lives in Boston. He has a desire to learn and has attended night school for two years, taking a class taught by Alice Kinnian. He learns to read and write, though his spelling and penmanship are poor and he is unable to spell his own name. He works as a janitor at a bakery, where his coworkers amuse themselves by taking advantage of his disability, and enjoys playing with children at a playground. 

Alice takes Charly to researchers Dr. Richard Nemur and Dr. Anna Straus, who have been investigating methods for increasing intelligence. Having successfully tested a surgical procedure on a lab mouse named Algernon, they are looking for a human test subject. They put Charly through a battery of aptitude tests and have him try to solve a series of paper mazes while Algernon runs through models of them. Charly consistently loses to Algernon, but is selected for the surgery. 

After surgery, Charly loses to Algernon again and is frustrated at not immediately becoming smarter. After some time passes, he finally beats Algernon and his intelligence begins to increase. His coworkers tell him to operate a complex machine, hoping that he will break it so they can have the day off, but he successfully operates it. Embarrassed and frightened by his new intelligence, they persuade the bakery owners to fire Charly. Alice continues teaching him, but his intelligence continues to increase and eventually surpasses hers. Lacking emotional maturity, Charly becomes infatuated with Alice and confesses his love for her, but she sharply rejects his advances. He flees in an act of rebellion but eventually returns to Boston, and the two start to consider marriage. 

Nemur and Straus present their research at a convention. After playing the film of Charly's original aptitude tests, they bring him out for a question-and-answer session. His intelligence now equals or exceeds everyone in the audience, but he has also developed a cynical view of humanity that the attendees mistake for humor.  He reveals that Algernon has lost his enhanced intelligence and died, facts that the research team kept from him, and expects to undergo a similar decline. 

Charly overhears Alice, Nemur, and Straus discussing his situation and offers to assist in finding a way to preserve his intelligence, but their combined efforts prove fruitless. He falls into a depression and asks Alice never to visit him again. Some time later, Alice sees Charly playing with children on the playground, having fully regressed to his original level of intellectual disability.

Cast 

 Cliff Robertson – Charly Gordon
 Claire Bloom – Alice Kinnian
 Lilia Skala – Dr. Anna Straus
 Leon Janney – Dr. Richard Nemur
 Ruth White – Mrs. Apple
 Dick Van Patten – Bert (as Richard Van Patten)
 Edward McNally – Gimpy (as Skipper McNally)
 Barney Martin – Hank
 William Dwyer – Joey
 Dan Morgan – Paddy

Music by 

 Ravi Shankar

Production history

Development

The short story Flowers for Algernon had been the basis of "The Two Worlds of Charlie Gordon", a 1961 television adaptation in which Robertson had also starred for The United States Steel Hour. Robertson had starred in a number of television shows that were turned into films with other actors playing his roles, such as Days of Wine and Roses. He bought the rights to the story, hoping to star in the film version as well.

Robertson originally hired William Goldman to write the screenplay on the strength of Goldman's novel No Way to Treat a Lady, paying him $30,000 out of his own pocket. However, Robertson was unhappy with Goldman's work and then hired Stirling Silliphant to write a draft.

Robertson received only $25,000 for his role in the film.

Release
The film premiered at the Berlin Film Festival on June 28, 1968. It then opened at the Baronet Theatre in New York City on September 23, 1968.

Box office
The film was a hit, earning $7.25 million in theatrical rentals during its release in North America, and it earned an additional $1.25 million in theatrical rentals overseas, making it the 16th-highest-grossing film of 1968. After all costs were deducted (including $1,325,000 paid to profit share), the film reported a profit of $1,390,000, making it one of the few successful films made by Selmur/ABC Pictures.

Critical reception 

Vincent Canby called the film a "self-conscious contemporary drama, the first ever to exploit mental retardation for...the bittersweet romance of it"; he called Robertson's performance "earnest" but points out that "we [the audience] are forced into the vaguely unpleasant position of being voyeurs, congratulating ourselves for not being Charly as often as we feel a distant pity for him." Canby calls Nelson's direction "neo-Expo 67", referring to the use of split screen to "show simultaneously the reactions of two people facing each other and conversing" and the use of "little postage stamp-sized inserts of images within the larger screen frame." Time magazine called Charly an "odd little movie about mental retardation and the dangers of all-conquering science, done with a dash of whimsy." While "the historic sights in and around Charly's Boston setting have never been more lovingly filmed", "The impact of [Robertson's] performance...is lessened by Producer-Director Ralph Nelson's determination to prove that he learned how to be new and now at Expo '67: almost every other sequence is done in split screens, multiple images, still shots or slow motion." Screenwriter (and Hollywood blacklist target) Maurice Rapf called Robertson's performance "extraordinary" and called "astonishing" his on-screen "transformation from one end of the intellectual spectrum to the other"; Rapf took issue with what he called the "pyrotechnics of the camera" and the "flashy opticals", calling the effects "jarringly out of place" and better suited for a "no-story mod film like The Knack."

Roger Ebert gave the film three stars out of four, writing "The relationship between Charly (Cliff Robertson) and the girl (Claire Bloom) is handled delicately and well. She cares for him, but inadequately understands the problems he's facing. These become more serious when he passes normal IQ and moves into the genius category; his emotional development falls behind. It is this story, involving a personal crisis, which makes Charly a warm and rewarding film." By contrast, Ebert pointed out "the whole scientific hocus-pocus, which causes his crisis, is irrelevant and weakens the movie by distracting us."

In 2009, Entertainment Weekly listed Charly among its "25 Best Movie Tearjerkers Ever."

Awards and nominations 

Cliff Robertson won the Academy Award for Best Actor, but under some controversy; less than two weeks after the ceremony, Time magazine mentioned the academy's generalized concerns over "excessive and vulgar solicitation of votes" and said that "many members agreed that Robertson's award was based more on promotion than on performance".

Proposed sequel 

In the late 1970s, following a period of extended unemployment after having alerted authorities to illegal activities committed by Columbia Pictures president David Begelman, Robertson wrote and attempted to produce Charly II, to no avail.

Home media 

Charly was released on Region 1 DVD by MGM Home Entertainment on March 31, 2005.

See also
 Algernon Charles Swinburne
 List of American films of 1968
 Charlie and Algernon, a musical based upon the original story, Flowers for Algernon.
 Flowers for Algernon (film), a 2000 television film starring Matthew Modine as Charly.

References

External links 

 
 
 
 

1968 films
1960s science fiction drama films
ABC Motion Pictures films
American science fiction drama films
Films scored by Ravi Shankar
Films about intellectual disability
Films based on science fiction novels
Films directed by Ralph Nelson
Films featuring a Best Actor Academy Award-winning performance
Films based on television plays
Films set in Massachusetts
Films shot in Massachusetts
Human experimentation in fiction
Films with screenplays by Stirling Silliphant
Cinerama Releasing Corporation films
1968 drama films
1960s English-language films
1960s American films